The Eternal derby, also called the Derby of Southeast Europe and Belgrade derby, is the local derby in Belgrade, capital of Serbia, between fierce city rivals Red Star Belgrade and Partizan Belgrade, two of the biggest and most popular clubs in Serbia, although the derby has caused division throughout the whole of Serbia. It has been described as "one of European football's most bitter rivalries".

The rivalry is present in a number of different sports but the most intense matches are in football and basketball sections of both clubs. It started immediately after the creation of the two clubs in 1945 and the two clubs have been dominant in domestic football since then.

According to a 2008 survey, Red Star is the most popular club in Serbia with 48% of the population supporting them. The second most popular is Partizan. They also have many supporters in Republika Srpska, Montenegro and Serbian diaspora.

The football rivalry is highly regarded worldwide being as among the fiercest ones. The highest attendance for a Red Star–Partizan match was about 100,000 spectators at the Red Star Stadium.

History

Origins of both Red Star and Partizan are found in political institutions of the post-World War II Communist Yugoslavia. Red Star was formed on 4 March 1945 by the United Alliance of Anti-Fascist Youth, part of the new civil authority in Yugoslavia. A few months later, on 4 October 1945, Partizan was founded as the sports association of the Yugoslav People's Army (JNA). The first match between the two football teams was played on 5 January 1947. Red Star won 4–3 and an intense rivalry has developed since. Partizan got its first win, 1-0, in the very next derby on 27 April 1947.

However, the fierce Belgrade derby tradition originates from the pre-World War II rivalry between BSK Belgrade and SK Jugoslavija in the Kingdom of Yugoslavia. SK Jugoslavija was disbanded in 1945 by the new Communist authorities with its property nationalized and most of it signed over to the newly-formed Red Star. On the other hand, BSK was allowed to continue its existence by the new authorities; after successive name changes, the club came to be known as OFK Beograd since 1957, losing its relevance to the newly-founded Partizan in the process. Although OFK Beograd became successful in its own right, both Red Star and Partizan quickly overtook it in popularity.

Over time, the on-pitch rivalry between Red Star and Partizan in the Yugoslavian Championship reflected the power struggle between the Interior ministry and the Ministry of Defence. The two clubs were dominant in the post-1945 Yugoslav First League, with Red Star having won 19, and Partizan having won 11 Yugoslav championships. The clashes of these two against Hajduk Split and Dinamo Zagreb, the third and fourth respectively in number of national titles, were similarly intense. The four clubs were known as the big 4. After the break-up of Yugoslavia in 1992, the Belgrade derby further intensified, the two clubs having since then won all national titles except one, with Partizan winning a further 16 and Red Star winning 13 by 2022.

Honours

Honours

International
Red Star has won 2 international, 2 regional and 62 domestic trophies, making them the most successful football club in Serbia and the former Yugoslavia. Partizan participated in one European final, won 44 domestic trophies and also 1 regional trophy.

Red Star:
International titles – 4
 European Cup / UEFA Champions League
 Winners (1): 1990–91
 Intercontinental Cup
 Winners (1): 1991
 UEFA Cup / UEFA Europa League
 Runners-up (1): 1978–79
 UEFA Super Cup
 Runners-up (1): 1991
 Mitropa Cup
 Winners (2): 1958, 1967–68

Partizan:
International titles – 1
 European Cup / UEFA Champions League
 Runners-up (1): 1965–66
 Mitropa Cup
 Winners (1): 1978

Supporters

An important aspect of the Belgrade derby are the fans. Both sides prepare intensely between the matches, make large flags and special messages that are appropriate for that particular occasion, to be usually directed towards the opposing side.

Delije

Supporters of the various Red Star sports teams are known as Delije (Serbian Cyrillic: Делије, roughly translated to English as Heroes). The word Delije is plural of delija, a word of Turkish origin (deli) that entered the Serbian language during the Ottoman period, meaning brave, strong or handsome young man. The name Delije first began to be used by hardcore Red Star supporters during the late 1980s, with official inauguration taking place on 7 January 1989. Up to that point, the die-hard Red Star fans were scattered amongst 7–8 fan groups that shared the north stand at the Red Star Stadium (known colloquially as Marakana), most prominent of which were Red Devils, Zulu Warriors, and Ultras. As a sign of appreciation the club direction allowed the word Delije in block letters to be written across their stadium's north stand – the gathering point of the club's most loyal and passionate fans. They are also called Cigani (English: Gypsies) by their arch rivals Grobari, fans of Partizan. Although Delije generally consider the name Cigani to be insulting, they occasionally use this name in their own songs and chants. By 2010, Delije consist of four larger groups: Belgrade Boys, Ultra Boys, Heroes, and Brigate.

Grobari
Partizan's supporters, known as Grobari (Serbian Cyrillic: Гробари, Gravediggers or Undertakers), were formed in 1970. The origin of the nickname itself is uncertain, but an accepted theory is that it was given by their biggest rivals, the Red Star fans, referring to club's mostly black colours which were similar to the uniforms of cemetery undertakers. The other theory says that the name arrives from the Partizan's stadium street name, Humska (humka meaning "grave mound"), in actuality named after medieval land of Hum. The first groups of organized Partizan supporters began to visit the JNA stadium in the late 1950s. Partizan's participation in the 1966 European Cup Final attracted much more fans to the stadium and it is considered to be the point when the organized fans moved to the south stand of the stadium, where they gather to this day. During the 1970s the Grobari started bringing fan equipment to the stadiums such as supporting scarves, signs, banners and flares. By the 1980s the Grobari were one of the four main fan groups in SFR Yugoslavia and began touring all Partizan's matches across the country and Europe. Because of their expressed hooliganism toward other clubs' supporters in those times, fans who represented the core of the Grobari firm were often called among themselves "Riot Squad". They were best known for their English style of supporting, which was mainly based on loud and continuous singing. By 2010, the Grobari consisted of three large groups: Grobari 1970, Zabranjeni and Južni Front.

Stadiums

When Red Star Belgrade is the host, the derby is played at Rajko Mitić Stadium. Colloquially known as "Marakana" after the famous Brazilian stadium, it was opened in 1963. Its capacity is 53,000 spectators (100,000 before UEFA regulations), the highest in the country. Red Star Stadium was the host of 1973 European Cup Final, UEFA Euro 1976 Final and 1979 UEFA Cup Final.

When the host is Partizan, the derby is played at Partizan Stadium, formerly known as JNA Stadium which is still its common name. It was opened in 1949. Its capacity is 29,775 spectators (55,000 before UEFA regulations). Partizan fans call it Fudbalski Hram (English: "Temple of Football").
Both stadiums are located 1 kilometre away from each other in the Autokomanda neighborhood of Belgrade.

Records
Players
Most appearances: 31, Saša Ilić for Partizan.
Most goals: 13, Marko Valok for Partizan.
Youngest player used: 16 years and 30 days, Dušan Vlahović for Partizan on 27 February 2016 (150th Eternal derby).
Oldest player used: 41 years and 116 days, Saša Ilić for Partizan on 25 April 2019 (160th Eternal derby).

Clubs
Most consecutive league victories: 24, Red Star during 2015–16 season.
Most consecutive league games without defeat (undefeated run): 57, Red Star from 14 October 2017 to 20 April 2019 (counting playoffs).

Season
Most points won in a single season: 108, Red Star during 2020–21 season.
Most team goals in a single season: 114, Red Star during 2020–21 season.
The best goal difference in a single season: +94, Red Star during 2020–21 season.
Most points difference in a single season: 32 points. After 24 played rounds Red Star had 68 points with the first place in the league while Partizan had 36 points placing them 6th in the league during 2015–16 season.

Attendance
Highest single game attendance: 100 000 spectators on 7 November 1976 (59th Eternal derby).

Player records

Head-to-head ranking in Yugoslav First League (1947–1992)

Head-to-head ranking in First League of Serbia and Montenegro and Serbian SuperLiga (1992–present) 

• Total: Red Star with 43 higher finishes, Partizan with 33 higher finishes (as of the end of the 2021–22 season)

Statistics

Head to head results

As of 3 March 2023, a total of 169 derby games have been played in the domestic league.

Before the 1963–64 season all derby matches were played at Partizan Stadium.

All statistics correct as of 3 March 2023.

Last ten matches

Players who have played for both clubs (senior career)
Miodrag Jovanović (Red Star, through BSK Beograd, Partizan)
Milivoje Đurđević (Partizan, Red Star)
Milovan Ćirić (Red Star, Partizan)
Jovan Jezerkić (Red Star, Partizan, again Red Star)
Jovan Beleslin (Red Star, Partizan)
Tihomir Ognjanov (Partizan, through Spartak Subotica, Red Star)
Bela Palfi (Partizan, through Spartak Subotica, Red Star)
Miomir Petrović (Red Star, Partizan)
Božidar Drenovac (Red Star, Partizan)
Vasilije Šijaković (Partizan, through BSK Beograd, Red Star)
Ranko Borozan (Partizan, Red Star)
Branko Zebec (Partizan, Red Star)
Antun Rudinski (Red Star, Partizan)
Radivoje Ognjanović (Partizan, Red Star)
Velibor Vasović (Partizan, Red Star, again Partizan)
Zvezdan Čebinac (Partizan, Red Star)
Vladimir Jocić (Red Star, through Radnički Niš, Partizan)
Milan Babić (Red Star, through Napredak, Partizan)
Milko Đurovski (Red Star, Partizan)
Goran Milojević (Red Star, Partizan)
Dejan Joksimović (Red Star, through Vojvodina, Partizan, again Red Star)
Rade Mojović (Partizan, through Obilić, Red Star)
Petar Puača (Red Star, Partizan, through OFK Beograd, Obilić, again Red Star)
Nikoslav Bjegović (Partizan, through Radnički Kragujevac, OFK Beograd, Vojvodina, Red Star)
Dalibor Škorić (Partizan, through Rudar Pljevlja, Rad, Red Star)
Cléo (Red Star, Partizan)
Vladimir Stojković (Red Star, through Nantes, Vitesse, Sporting, Getafe, Wigan Athletic, again Sporting, Partizan, Ergotelis, Maccabi Haifa, Nottingham Forest, again Partizan)
Miloš Bosančić (Partizan, through Boavista, OFK Beograd, Čukarički, Slovan Liberec, Gyeongnam, Red Star)
Aboubakar Oumarou (Red Star, through OFK Beograd, Vojvodina, Waasland-Beveren, Partizan)
Petar Đuričković (Red Star, through Radnički Kragujevac, Radnički Niš, Partizan)
Ognjen Ožegović (Red Star, through Banat, Voždovac, Rad, Jagodina, Borac Čačak, Vojvodina, Changchun Yatai, Čukarički, Partizan)

Transfers between two clubs (players)
Milivoje Đurđević (from Partizan to Red Star in summer 1947)
Milovan Ćirić (from Red Star to Partizan in summer 1947)
Jovan Jezerkić (from Red Star to Partizan in autumn 1947)
Jovan Jezerkić (from Partizan to Red Star in summer 1948)
Miomir Petrović (from Red Star to Partizan in summer 1948)
Božidar Drenovac (from Red Star to Partizan in summer 1948)
Dušan Krajčinović (from Red Star to Partizan in summer 1952)
Ranko Borozan (from Partizan to Red Star in summer 1957)
Branko Zebec (from Partizan to Red Star in summer 1959)
Antun Rudinski (from Red Star to Partizan in summer 1962)
Radivoje Ognjanović (from Partizan to Red Star in summer 1962)
Velibor Vasović (from Partizan to Red Star in summer 1963)
Velibor Vasović (from Red Star to Partizan in summer 1964)
Zvezdan Čebinac (from Partizan to Red Star in summer 1964)
Milko Đurovski (from Red Star to Partizan in summer 1986)
Goran Milojević (from Red Star to Partizan in summer 1988)
Dejan Joksimović (from Partizan to Red Star in summer 1990)
Petar Puača (from Red Star to Partizan in autumn 1990)
Cléo (from Red Star to Partizan in summer 2009)

Transfers between two clubs (coaches)
Milovan Ćirić (from Partizan to Red Star in summer 1954.)

Players who played for one club in youth career and for rival club in senior career
Dušan Krajčinović (youth career Red Star, senior career Partizan)
Dragoljub Živković (youth career Partizan, Red Star, senior career Red Star, Rad)
Nenad Stavrić (youth career Red Star, senior career Majdanpek, Partizan, Pelister, Radnički Niš, Rad, Radnički Beograd, Olympiakos Nicosia)
Nikola Marjanović (youth career Red Star, senior career Galenika, Rijeka, Partizan, Vojvodina, Degerforš)
Petar Puača (youth career with both Red Star and Partizan, senior career with Red Star)
Miroslav Čermelj (youth career Red Star, senior career Obilić, Partizan, Pumas UNAM, Extremadura, Atlas, Puebla, Beijing Guoan, Čukarički, Rudar Pljevlja)
Dragan Stevanović (youth career Partizan, senior career Voždovac, Rad, Wolfsburg, St.Pauli, again Rad, Red Star)
Saša Radivojević (youth career Partizan, senior career Radnički Beograd, Zeta, Pegah Gilan, Apollon Kalamarias, Red Star)
Goran Adamović (youth career with both Red Star and Partizan, senior career BSK Borča, Red Star, Budućnost)
Žarko Lazetić (youth career Red Star, senior career Obilić, Smederevo, Beograd, Bežanija, Partizan)
Goran Gavrančić (youth career Red Star, senior career Čukarički, Dynamo Kyiv, PAOK Thessaloniki, Partizan)
Jovan Krneta (youth career Partizan, senior career Teleoptik, Sopot, Red Star)
Ljubo Nenadić (youth career Partizan, senior career Teleoptik, Grafičar, Radnički Kragujevac, Metalac, again Radnički Kragujevac, Red Star)
Aleksandar Pantić (youth career Partizan, senior career Rad, Red Star)
Milan Jokić (youth career Partizan, senior career Red Star)
Novak Martinović (youth career Partizan, senior career Rad, BSK Borča, OFK Beograd, Smederevo, Panduri, Steaua, Wuhan, Red Star)
Filip Kljajić (youth career Red Star, senior career Hajduk Beograd, Šumadija Jagnjilo, Metalac, Rad, Partizan)
Nikola Antić (youth career Partizan, senior career Rad, Palić, again Rad, Red Star)
Zoran Rendulić (youth career Partizan, senior career Remont Čačak, Borac Čačak, Ried, Grenoble, Javor Ivanjica, Pohang Steelers, Shenyang Shenbei, Čukarički, Red Star)
Marko Jovičić (youth career Red Star, Rad, Partizan, senior career Žarkovo, Teleoptik, Partizan)
Stefan Milošević (youth career Red Star, Partizan, senior career Spartak Subotica, Red Star)
Nemanja G. Miletić (youth career Red Star, senior career Sopot, Radnički Stobex, again Sopot, again Radnički Stobex, Mačva Šabac, Javor Ivanjica, Partizan)
Stefan Ilić (youth career Red Star, Partizan, senior career Spartak Subotica, Red Star)
Uroš Đurđević (youth career Red Star, senior career Rad, Vitesse, Palermo, Partizan)
Aleksandar Pešić (youth career Partizan, senior career Radnički Niš, OFI Crete, Sheriff Tiraspol, Jagodina, Toulouse, Atalanta, Red Star)
Nemanja Radonjić (youth career Partizan, senior career Viitorul Constanta, Roma, Empoli, again Roma, Čukarički, Red Star)
Nikola Stojiljković (youth career Partizan, senior career Rad, Čukarički, Braga, Kayserispor, Red Star)
Radivoj Bosić (youth career Red Star, senior career Grafičar, Partizan)

Played for one club and coached the rival club
Petar Ćosić (senior career Red Star, Izmir as player, Crvenka, Budućnost Valjevo, BASK Beograd, national team of Jordan, young national selection of Yugoslavia, young selection of Partizan, Teleoptik as coach)
Ratko Dostanić (youth career Partizan as player, through Obilić, Smederevo, Slavia Sofia, Red Star, again Slavia Sofia, OFK Belgrade, Bežanija, Veria, Dalian, Vardar, Srem, Levski Sofia, again Red Star as coach)

Players who have played for both clubs (youth career)
Goran Medenica (Partizan, Red Star)
Goran Nikolajev (Partizan, Red Star)
Branislav Janković (Red Star, Partizan)
Filip Stojanović (Red Star, Partizan)
Nemanja Matić (Red Star, Partizan)
Milenko Pjević (Red Star, Partizan)
Luka Savić (Partizan, Red Star)
Mihajlo Cakić (Red Star, Partizan)
Dragan Mitrović (Red Star, Partizan)
Milan Savić (Red Star, Partizan)
Marko Šiškov (Partizan, Red Star)
Jovan Aleksić (Red Star, Partizan)
Ivan Marković (Red Star, Partizan)
Nikola Tričković (Red Star, Partizan)
Đorđe Nikolić (Red Star, Partizan)
Dušan Antić (Red Star, Partizan)
Andrija Sekulić (Partizan, Red Star)
Martin Novaković (Partizan, Red Star)

Players who have played in Eternal derby for both clubs (league and cup matches)
Milivoje Đurđević (1 match for Partizan, 9 matches for Red Star)
Jovan Jezerkić (6 matches for Red Star, 2 matches for Partizan)
Bela Palfi (4 matches for Partizan, 9 matches for Red Star)
Miomir Petrović (5 matches for Red Star, 3 matches for Partizan)
Božidar Drenovac (3 matches for Red Star, 4 matches for Partizan)
Vasilije Šijaković (1 match for Partizan, 1 match for Red Star)
Ranko Borozan (5 matches for Partizan, 3 matches for Red Star)
Branko Zebec (14 matches for Partizan, 3 matches for Red Star)
Velibor Vasović (11 matches for Partizan, 1 match for Red Star)
Milan Babić (1 match for Red Star, 1 match for Partizan)
Milko Đurovski (8 matches for Red Star, 6 matches for Partizan)
Goran Milojević (7 matches for Red Star, 7 matches for Partizan)
Dejan Joksimović (2 matches for Red Star, 2 matches for Partizan)
Cléo (2 matches for Red Star, 3 matches for Partizan)
Vladimir Stojković (2 matches for Red Star, 11 matches for Partizan)
Miloš Bosančić (1 match for Partizan, 2 matches for Red Star)
Aboubakar Oumarou (2 matches for Red Star, 1 match for Partizan)

Players who have scored in Eternal derby for both clubs (championship and cup matches)
Jovan Jezerkić (3 goals for Red Star, 2 goals for Partizan)
Branko Zebec (5 goals for Partizan, 1 goal for Red Star)
Milko Đurovski (6 goals for Red Star, 2 goals for Partizan)

Coaches who worked at both clubs
Milovan Ćirić (Partizan, Red Star)
Aleksandar Tomašević (Red Star, through Odred Ljubljana, Vardar, Hajduk Split, Partizan)
Gojko Zec (Partizan, through Borac Banjaluka, Vojvodina, Rijeka, Red Star)
Velibor Vasović (Partizan, through Proleter, Angers SCO, Paris Saint-Germain, Ethnikos Piraeus, Red Star)
Toma Savić goalkeeping coach (Partizan, Red Star)

List of the Eternal derby league matches

List of the Eternal derby cup matches

Partizan participated with two teams.

Basketball rivalry

National trophies in five popular team sports

See also
 List of association football club rivalries in Europe
 List of Red Star Belgrade footballers
 List of FK Partizan players

References

External links

 https://web.archive.org/web/20180718065040/http://www.srpskiderbi.com/

Football rivalries in Serbia
Football in Belgrade
Sports competitions in Belgrade
Crvena zvezda
1947 establishments in Serbia
Recurring sporting events established in 1947
FK Partizan